East Freetown is one of two villages in the town of Freetown, Bristol County, Massachusetts, United States.  Added to the town in 1747, East Freetown was originally an outpost settlement of Tiverton, Rhode Island, then a part of Massachusetts.  It rests on the shore of Long Pond.

History
East Freetown was made a part of Freetown as a result of the Pocasset Purchase of 1747.  It remained less economically developed and industrialized than its sister village, Assonet well into the 20th century.  The village was the birthplace of Massachusetts Governor Marcus Morton.

Historic District

The East Freetown Historic District has been on the National Register of Historic Places since 1999.  It contains many buildings, sites, and features of local historical significance. The district is located roughly along Howland, Gurney, Washburn County Roads.

Geography
East Freetown is located in Southeastern Massachusetts.  It is bounded by Dartmouth, Fall River, New Bedford, Lakeville, Assonet, Rochester, Acushnet, and Long Pond.  It has a hilly terrain, with many outcroppings of bedrock.  Maple, elm, oak, pine, and birch trees are common throughout.  Numerous streams and brooks flow through the village, including Fall Brook.

Many peninsulas exist around Long Pond, laying site for summer resorts such as Heaven's Heights and Hemlock Point.  A small portion of the village comprises  a part of the Freetown-Fall River State Forest.

Churches
Several churches have been built in East Freetown.

St. John Neumann Church
St. John Neumann Church is a Roman Catholic parish covering the village of East Freetown.  On the grounds of the church are Cathedral Camp and Our Lady of the Lake camp, both of which combined to form the co-ed Cathedral Camp.  The camp has an extensive outdoor program, including swimming and boating on Long Pond.

East Freetown Congregational-Christian Church

The East Freetown Congregational-Christian Church is a gathering of people who emphasize music, prayer, and Bible-based preaching as part of their worship life together. The congregation is bound by a covenant and is considered "non-credal". That means there is no declared statement which is used as a filter of membership. The congregation has not been part of any other denomination or structure since its gathering in 1831. From its inception in the New England Christian Connexion movement of the 18th-19th century, the congregation has maintained five tenets of that movement: 1. the Lordship of Jesus Christ as the sole head of the church; 2. the use of no other name than "Christian"; 3. the canonical Scriptures as the only rule of faith and practice; 4. individual duty of the interpretation of the Scriptures; 5. Christian character as a test of fellowship.  The church took on the additional title "Congregational" in 1931 as a recognition of the historical roots of its polity, and as part of an emerging spirit of communion among Reformed tradition American churches.
ed

Schools
From the early 19th century until 1950, Freetown was serviced by several neighborhood grammar schools, several of which existed in East Freetown.

Furnace School
Mason's Corner School

Today
From 1950 forward, students have attended the Freetown Elementary School, first for grades 1-8, later K-6, and currently PreK-3.  Students also attend George R. Austin Intermediate School (4-5), and Freetown-Lakeville Middle School (6-8).

For secondary education, students have three options:  Apponequet Regional High School serves students with an academic focus for grades 9-12.  Old Colony Regional Vocational Technical High School in Rochester accepts students from Assonet when there are openings, and provides a voc-tech atmosphere.  Bristol County Agricultural High School serves students wanting to focus primarily in agricultural and animal studies.

See also
National Register of Historic Places listings in Bristol County, Massachusetts

References

External links

Friends of Historic Preservation - Freetown, Massachusetts

Villages in Bristol County, Massachusetts
Freetown, Massachusetts
Providence metropolitan area
1727 establishments in Massachusetts
Historic districts in Bristol County, Massachusetts
Villages in Massachusetts
National Register of Historic Places in Bristol County, Massachusetts
Historic districts on the National Register of Historic Places in Massachusetts